Kingsley Osagie "JJ" Enagbare (born January 18, 2000) is an American football outside linebacker for the Green Bay Packers of the National Football League (NFL). He played college football at South Carolina.

Early life and high school
Enagbare grew up in North of Atlanta, Georgia and attended Hapeville Charter Academy. He was named the Class AA Defensive Player of the Year by The Atlanta Journal-Constitution as a senior. Enagbare committed to play college football at South Carolina shortly before the start of his senior season.

College career
Enagbare joined the Gamecocks as an early enrollee and was moved from defensive end to defensive tackle during spring practices. He played in 12 games and finished his freshman season with 20 tackles with three tackles for loss and one sack. He moved back to defensive end as a sophomore and recorded 27 tackles, seven tackles for loss, and 3.5 sacks. As a junior, Enagbare had 30 tackles, seven tackles for loss, and six sacks with three forced fumbles and was named first-team All-Southeastern Conference (SEC) by the league's coaches and was a second-team selection by the Associated Press.

Professional career

Enagbare was drafted by the Green Bay Packers in the fifth round (179th overall) of the 2022 NFL Draft. On May 6, 2022, he signed his rookie contract. On October 16, 2022, he recorded his first career sack on Zach Wilson during a Week 6 loss to the New York Jets.

NFL career statistics

Regular season

References

External links
Green Bay Packers bio
South Carolina Gamecocks bio

2000 births
Living people
Players of American football from Atlanta
American football defensive ends
American sportspeople of Nigerian descent
South Carolina Gamecocks football players
Green Bay Packers players